Eutrapela is a genus of moths in the family Geometridae. It contains only one species, Eutrapela clemataria, the curve-toothed geometer moth or purplish-brown looper, which is found in North America, where it has been recorded from Nova Scotia to Florida, west to Texas and north to Saskatchewan. The habitat consists of deciduous and mixed woodlands.

The wingspan is 38–56 mm. The ground color of the wings is yellowish-tan with brownish-grey or brown mottling. The forewings have a fine, mostly straight postmedial line. The hindwing outer margin is scalloped. Adults are on wing from March to August in most of the range, but year round in the south. There are two generations per year.

The larvae feed on the leaves of various trees, including ash, basswood, birch, elm, fir, maple, poplar and willow. Young larvae have a dark brown body. Older larvae have a greenish or tan to dark purplish-brown body.

References

External links
Natural History Museum Lepidoptera genus database

Ourapterygini
Monotypic moth genera
Taxa named by Jacob Hübner
Moths of North America